Joseph Mellish (c. 1717 - 7 December 1790) was a British Member of Parliament.

Family 
He was the third son of Joseph Mellish of Doncaster and Blyth Hall, Nottinghamshire. An elder brother was William Mellish, MP for East Retford. He married his cousin Catherine Gore, the daughter of John Gore, MP of Bush Hill, Middlesex.

Politics 
He was himself elected MP for Great Grimsby from 1761 to 1780.

References 

1710s births
1790 deaths
Year of birth uncertain
Joseph
Members of the Parliament of Great Britain for Great Grimsby
British MPs 1761–1768
British MPs 1768–1774
British MPs 1774–1780